Border is an unincorporated community on the western edge of Millard County, Utah, United States, on the Nevada state line. U.S. Route 6/U.S. Route 50 passes through the community.

See also

References

External links

Unincorporated communities in Millard County, Utah
Unincorporated communities in Utah
Great Basin National Heritage Area